Masters Karting Paris Bercy was an indoor karting competition which was held from 1993 to 2001 on a temporary circuit at the Palais Omnisport de Paris Bercy in December. Founded in 1993 by former Formula 1 driver Philippe Streiff, it was intended to gather the best drivers from all disciplines of motorsport and  karting. In 2011, ERDF decided to revive the competition with electric karts.

Elf Masters (1993-2001) 

The first edition of the Elf Masters took place on 18 and 19 December 1993. Two races were held each evening, a relay race contested by teams of three drivers (a Formula 1 driver, a driver from another discipline of motorsport and a young kart driver) and stroke accounting for the CIK Championship. This weekend marked the last duel on the track between Alain Prost and Ayrton Senna.

In 1994 the team relay was replaced by a simple race between the big names in motorsport. It was a battle between Alain Prost and Michael Schumacher the held the Bercy arena in suspense. French driver Jean-Christophe Boullion won the first race on Saturday and Alessandro Zanardi won on Sunday.

In 1995, Prost and Schumacher did not participate and it was a young French driver, David Terrien who won the first race ahead of Gianni Morbidelli. On Sunday Luca Badoer won the race ahead of David Terrien.

In 1996, the relay race returned and Michael Schumacher came back to Bercy and started all the weekend's races. He won the CIK race on Sunday.

In 1997, Jacques Villeneuve started at Bercy. On Saturday Alessandro Zanardi won the F1 race. Mika Salo won on Sunday.

In 1998, Mario Andretti, Jody Scheckter and Mick Doohan came to Bercy. Also competing were names such as Dario Franchitti, Tony Kanaan and Fernando Alonso who would later find success in higher racing categories. Emmanuel Collard won on Saturday and Jean-Christophe Boullion won on Sunday. That year Fernando Alonso won the first CIK race and Giorgio Pantano won the second.

In 1999, no high profile motorsport and F1 stars were present. Stéphane Sarrazin won the first superfinale and Franck Montagny the second. This year Robert Kubica won the second CIK race.

In 2000, the three-driver relay race was reintroduced and it was the French team of Sébastien Bourdais, Jean-Christophe Boullion and Julien Poncelet that won on Saturday. The European team of Franck Lagorce, Clivio Piccione and Félix Porteiro won on Sunday. Lewis Hamilton won one of the support races.

In 2001, the relay team of Vitantonio Liuzzi, Davide Forè and Franck Lagorce won the superfinal. Sebastian Vettel won the junior race ahead of Nico Hülkenberg. It was the last edition of the Elf Masters.

References

External links
Philippe Streiff's official website

Kart racing
Kart racing events
Motorsport competitions in France
Sports competitions in Paris